Back button may refer to:

Back button (web browser), a common web browser feature that retrieves the previous resource
Backspace key, the computer keyboard key that deletes the character(s) to the left of the cursor. 
Back closure, a means for fastening a garment at the rear